Niemitz most often refers to:

 Carsten Niemitz (b. 1945), a German anatomist and evolutionary biologist

Niemitz may also refer to:

Niemica, Kamień County, a village in Poland formerly called Niemitz
Niemica, Sławno County, a village in Poland formerly called Niemitz
Niemica (river), a river in Poland formerly called Niemitz Bach

See also
Niemytzki plane, a topological space in mathematics
Nimitz (disambiguation)
Ethnonymic surnames